Tom Cotcher (born  28 July 1950) is a Scottish actor who played Alan Woods in The Bill from 1992 to 1996.  He also appeared briefly in an earlier episode of the police drama (as did several of the cast) as a local resident with a missing dog.  Since then he has appeared in Taggart and Night and Day, and in October 2007 as a doctor in EastEnders. He has also made appearances as Chief Superintendent Hobbs in River City. Tom voiced the character of Rick, the spotter in the racing video games TOCA Race Driver 2 and 3, in 2004 and 2006, respectively, as well as the characters of Benhart of Jugo and Cromwell the Pardoner in the action role-playing video game Dark Souls II in 2014. He appeared as Daniel Brown in the 2017 Holby City episode Sleep Well. Tom is the narrator on the UK editions of Ice Road Truckers. He is a husband and father living in Brighton, England.

In 2018, Cotcher recorded a two-part edition of The Bill Podcast to discuss his life and career.

External links

Scottish male television actors
Scottish male soap opera actors
1950 births
Living people